Zdenko Jelčić (born 8 August 1946) is a Croatian actor. He has appeared in more than fifty films since 1972.

Selected filmography

References

External links 

1946 births
Living people
Croats of Bosnia and Herzegovina
People from Čapljina
Croatian male film actors